The Stephens County School District is a public school district in Stephens County, Georgia, USA, based in Toccoa. It serves the communities of Avalon, Martin, Eastanollee, and Toccoa.

Schools
The Stephen's County School District has four elementary schools, one middle school, and one high school.

Elementary schools
Big A Elementary School
Liberty Elementary School
Toccoa Elementary School
Fifth Grade Academy

Middle school
Stephens County Middle School

High school
Stephens County High School

References

External links

School districts in Georgia (U.S. state)
Education in Stephens County, Georgia
Educational institutions with year of establishment missing